Vikash Kumar (born 1 December 1996) is an Indian cricketer. He made his List A debut on 1 March 2021, for Mizoram in the 2020–21 Vijay Hazare Trophy. He made his Twenty20 debut on 4 November 2021, for Mizoram in the 2021–22 Syed Mushtaq Ali Trophy. He is right handed batsman. He made his first-class debut on 17 February 2022, for Mizoram in the 2021–22 Ranji Trophy.

References

External links
 

1996 births
Living people
Indian cricketers
Mizoram cricketers
Place of birth missing (living people)